Płońsk is a town in central Poland with 22,500 inhabitants (2010). 
Situated at the Płonka river in the historic region of Mazovia, it is the seat of Płońsk County in the Masovian Voivodeship.

History

According to archaeological research, the Płońsk stronghold was built in the late 10th century within the early Polish state. Dating back to 1155, is the first historical record confirming the existence of Płońsk. Around the castle a group of inhabitants was formed, most of whom initially worked on the land. As a result of the fragmentation of medieval Piast-ruled Poland, it was part of the duchies of Masovia and Płock, and then it was a royal town of the Polish Crown, administratively located in the Płock Voivodeship in the Greater Poland Province. In 1400, Siemowit IV of Masovia, granted it town rights under Chełmno law, then merchants and craftsmen started to come to the town.

In the early twentieth century, the population of 10,000 was equally divided between Poles and Jews. It was a centre of the garment industry. The Jews lived mostly within the city, whilst the Poles were more scattered and tended to live in the countryside. Many of the Jewish residents of Płońsk immigrated to Palestine for Zionist reasons, spurred on by the idea of building a Jewish homeland.

On August 14–17, 1920, the Poles successfully defended the town during a Soviet invasion.

During the joint German-Soviet invasion of Poland, which started World War II in September 1939, Germany invaded the town and the Einsatzgruppe V entered the town to commit various crimes against the populace. Under German occupation the town was annexed directly to Nazi Germany and was renamed Plöhnen. The Germans established and operated a court prison in the town. In 1940, the occupiers expelled around 1,000 Poles, whose houses and workshops were then handed over to German colonists as part of the Lebensraum policy. In September 1940, Jews from the town and the surrounding areas were imprisoned in a ghetto. Soon a typhus epidemic broke out. A hospital, a bathhouse for the sick, a pharmacy, and a folk kitchen were organized in the ghetto. In total, 12,000 Jews were prisoners of the ghetto and from October 1942, they were sent to the Auschwitz extermination camp. In 1943 in Berlin, the Germans sentenced six members of the local Polish resistance movement, some to death. On January 16–18, 1945, shortly before retreating, the German police carried out a massacre of 78 Poles in the town.

The town was administratively part of the Ciechanów Voivodeship from 1975 to 1998.

Landmarks
The church and the old monastery of Calced Carmelites were founded before 1417 by the Duke Siemowit IV of Masovia and his wife Aleksandra, sister of Polish King Władysław II Jagiełło. The old Sienkiewiczówka manor, which was home of Polish novelist and Nobel Prize laureate Henryk Sienkiewicz in the 1860s, is located in the Poświętne district. There he wrote his first unpublished novel Ofiara.

Transport
Płońsk is located at the intersection of the Polish S7 highway (partly under construction as of February 2022) and National roads No. 10 and 50. There is also a railway station in the town.

Sports and culture
The Memoriał Andrzeja Trochanowskiego one-day cycling race is based in Płońsk. The race takes place annually on May 1. It is home to a yearly open theatre festival (held in the summer).

In 2018, local Poles held a celebration in honor of David Ben-Gurion, who was born in the town, for the 70th anniversary of the re-establishment of the State of Israel.

Notable residents
 Henryk Sienkiewicz (1846–1916), novelist and journalist, Nobel Prize laureate
 David Ben-Gurion (1886–1973), the first Prime Minister of Israel

References

External links

Interactive map of Płońsk
Płońsk official website
Independent forum of Płońsk citizens
Jewish Community in Płońsk on Virtual Shtetl
The Story of the Jewish Community of Plonsk - an online exhibition in Yad Vashem website

Cities and towns in Masovian Voivodeship
Płońsk County
10th-century establishments in Poland
Populated places established in the 10th century
Płock Governorate
Warsaw Voivodeship (1919–1939)
Holocaust locations in Poland
Nazi war crimes in Poland
Historic Jewish communities in Poland